The Kenyatta National Hospital is the oldest hospital in Kenya. It is a public, tertiary, referral hospital for the  Ministry of Health. It is also the teaching hospital of the University of Nairobi College of Health Sciences. It is the 2nd largest hospital in the country and East Africa as well.

Location
The hospital is located in the area to the immediate west of Upper Hill in Nairobi, the capital and largest city of Kenya. The hospital complex measures .

Overview
KNH was founded as the Native Civil hospital, in 1901 with a bed capacity of 40. In 1952 it was renamed the King George VI Hospital, after King George VI of the United Kingdom. At that time the settler community was served by the nearby European Hospital (now Nairobi Hospital). The facility was renamed Kenyatta National Hospital, after Jomo Kenyatta, following independence from the British. It is currently the largest referral and teaching hospital in the country. Kenyatta National Hospital employs over 6,000 staff and has a bed capacity of 1,800. However, due to congestion, the patient numbers can rise as high as 3,000.

Administration
The hospital is administered by a 10-person board of directors, chaired by George Ooko, a non-physician, non-executive board member. The chief executive officer is Dr Evanson Kamuri. The principal of the College of Health Sciences of the University of Nairobi and representatives from the Ministry of Finance and from the Ministry of Health, also sit on the board.

It also serves as a teaching hospital of the Kenya Medical Training College, Nairobi campus among many other institutions that are affiliated to the facility due to its advanced specialisation in medical services in the country and beyond.

KNH serves as the teaching hospital of the College of Health Sciences at the University of Nairobi.

Notable staff 
Shitsama Nyamweya, neurosurgeon
Jemimah Kariuki, gynaecologist

See also
List of hospitals in Kenya
Ministry of Health (Kenya)
Catherine Nyongesa

References

External links

Website of Kenyatta National Hospital
Website of Ministry of Health (Kenya)

Hospital buildings completed in 1901
Hospitals established in 1901
Hospitals in Nairobi
Jomo Kenyatta
Buildings and structures in Nairobi
1901 establishments in Africa